Makinoa crispata is the only species of liverwort in the genus Makinoa and family Makinoaceae.  The genus Verdoornia was formerly included in this family, but has been transferred to the family Aneuraceae on the basis of recent cladistic analysis of genetic sequences.

References

External links
Images of Makinoa from the Hong Kong Flora on-line

Fossombroniales
Monotypic bryophyte genera
Liverwort genera